Cosmé McMunn (February 22, 1901 – August 22, 1980), who used the name Cosmé McMoon, was an Irish-Mexican-American pianist and composer, best known as the accompanist to notably tone-deaf soprano Florence Foster Jenkins.

Life and career
McMoon was born as Cosmé McMunn in 1901 in Mapimí, Mexico, the son of Maria (Valadez) and Cosme McMunn. His paternal grandparents were Irish and his mother was of Mexican descent. He moved with his family to San Antonio, Texas, around 1911.  He moved to New York City around 1920 to further his musical studies, and likely adopted the McMoon spelling around that time.  Jenkins met McMoon sometime in the 1920s, and knowing McMoon was a concert pianist, eventually asked him to help her prepare for her performances and accompany her.

Apart from giving occasional piano lessons, McMoon never achieved a career in music after Jenkins' death in 1944, and instead pursued a long interest in bodybuilding and judging bodybuilding contests. He was a master chess player and was fascinated with mathematics. He resided in New York City until shortly before his death in August 1980. McMoon was diagnosed with pancreatic cancer and moved back to San Antonio, and died two days after arriving. His remains were cremated and his ashes rest at Sunset Memorial Park in San Antonio. McMoon never married nor had any children.

Legacy

McMoon was portrayed by actor Donald Corren in Souvenir, a play about Florence Foster Jenkins' career, which ran on Broadway in 2005 and has since been staged in many regional theaters.

He is portrayed in a Golden Globe-nominated performance by Simon Helberg in the 2016 feature film about the life of Jenkins titled Florence Foster Jenkins. He was also one of the characters in Glorious!, 2005 stage comedy by Peter Quilter.

References

External links

 Cosme McMoon at Allmusic.com

Accompanists
1901 births
1980 deaths
20th-century American pianists
Mexican emigrants to the United States
Mexican people of Irish descent
American musicians of Mexican descent
Texas classical music
American male pianists
20th-century American male musicians
Hispanic and Latino American musicians